Dusisiren is an extinct genus of dugong related to the Steller's sea cow that lived in the North Pacific during the Neogene.

Paleobiology

Dusisiren is a sirenian exemplar of the evolutionary theory of punctuated equilibrium. It evolved from a mangrove-eating ancestor to adapt to cold climates in the North Pacific by developing the capability to feed on kelp beds out on the open coast. The incipient modifications to the cervicals suggest that it was capable of maneuvering and feeding in high-energy environments of surf-swept coasts with deep, cold water.

Species
There are four recognized species of Dusisiren:

Dusisiren jordani (Kellogg, 1925) (type)
Dusisiren reinharti Domning, 1978
Dusisiren dewana Takahashi, Domning, and Saito, 1986
Dusisiren takasatensis Kobayashi, Horikawa, & Miyazaki, 1995

See also
Evolution of sirenians

Related genus
Hydrodamalis

References

Miocene sirenians
Pliocene sirenians
Cenozoic mammals of Asia
Cenozoic mammals of North America
Prehistoric placental genera
Fossil taxa described in 1978